Talat Bang Khen is a khwaeng (subdistrict) of Lak Si District, in Bangkok, Thailand. In 2020, it had a total population of 27,717 people.

References

Lak Si district
Subdistricts of Bangkok